Glencastle is a small village in the northwest of County Mayo, Ireland.

Topography 

Glencastle is a mountain valley which was once known as the gateway to the Mullet Peninsula. In the middle of this glen stands an ancient fort called "Dun Donnell" or the fort of Domhnall. Domhnall was, according to legend, of the Gamanraige tribe and an ascendant of Ailill Finn, the husband of Flidhais, and involved in the tale of Táin Bó Flidhais. There are views of Broadhaven Bay and Blacksod Bay from the fort. As part of the cycle of Celtic folklore and legends, Domhnall used to close the gates of Erris at night levying tolls on passers-by. The remains of this fortification are now three large mounds which have never been archaeologically investigated.

History 

The O'Caithnaidhs, who were chiefs of Erris before the Norman Invasion in the 12th century AD, had their stronghold in Glencastle. They were defeated by the O'Connors who then took over the fort until 1303 when it was conquered by the Barrett Normans. In 1540, the Barrett's castle in Glencastle was so well known that the English called Erris, 'Arrus Dundohmnaill'. For the next two hundred years, the Barretts wielded their influence in Church and civil affairs.

There are several earlier archaeological monuments recorded in this village, but with the landscape destruction of the 21st century, it is doubtful if these are still in existence. It is recorded by engineer Patrick Knight that when the Belmullet/Bangor road was being made in the 1820s, that they "unnecessarily destroyed the fine dolmen in the glen rather than divert the road a few feet to one side."

Thomas Johnson Westropp, a purveyor of antiquities on the western seaboard, who visited the Erris area in the early 20th century wrote the following of Glencastle in 1911:
"It is a beautiful spot, especially after the dreary drive through barren moors from Crossmolina through Bangor. We suddenly dip into a stream runnel and, without preparation drop into a lovely wooded glen, at first so narrow that there is barely room for the road and the brook; we pass a regular brown dyke of volcanic rock and a thickly-wooded hillside, hovered over by hawks, and reach the more open valley, the 'Gates of Erris'. In its centre a grassy moat-like mass of rock was upheaved by some remote eruption. The east face is covered with hazels and birch, the upper trees growing out of the side to keep the shelter of the fort rising over 90 feet above the stream. To the north, a great mountain swells up for 760 feet facing the glen and its keeper. A second mound, like an overturned boat lies further down the valley"

References 

 Knight, Patrick. Erris in the Irish Highlands (1835) Dublin
 McDonnell, Bishop, Diocese of Killala p. 46
 Noone, Fr. Sean, Where the Sun Sets (1991) Kildare
 O'Donovan, Ordnance Survey Letters Vol. 1. p. 157
 Westropp, T. J. The Promontory Forts of Ireland. Vol. 49 Pt. 2 p. 137

Towns and villages in County Mayo